Sadananda Sagar (11 May 1944 – 5 January 2006), better known by his stage name Vajramuni, was an Indian actor who appeared in Kannada films. He portrayed negative characters during most of his career and was considered one of Kannada cinema's finest actors. Over his career, he came to be known for his "thundering voice and sterling performance[s]" that earned him the epithets, Nata Bhairava and Nata Bhayankara.

Vajramuni began his career as a stage actor and gained popularity with his portrayal of Ravana in Kanagal Prabhakar Shastri's play Prachanda Ravana. He made his film debut in 1969 with Puttanna Kanagal's Mallammana Pavada. His pairing with Rajkumar, with the latter as the lead, in the 1970s came to be widely appreciated, with films such as Sipayi Ramu (1972), Sampathige Savaal (1974), Premada Kanike (1976), Bahaddur Gandu (1976), Giri Kanye (1977) and Shankar Guru (1978). Recognizing his contribution to Kannada cinema, he was awarded the Lifetime Contribution to Kannada Cinema Award in 2006.

Early life
Vajramuni was born as Sadananda Sagar on 11 May 1944 in the Kanakanapalya, a locality in the Jayanagar neighbourhood of Bangalore, into a Vokkaliga family. He was named after the Hindu deity Vajramuneshwara, that members of his family were devotees of. They belonged to the cattle-rearing Hallikar community. Vajramuni's ancestors were given land grants and made custodians of the village of Anjanapura (in present-day Bangalore Urban district) by the then Maharaja of Mysore, and the family had settled there since. Vajramuni was the eldest of seven children. His father R. Vajrappa (d. 1986) was a politician and served as a corporator in Bangalore for four terms between 1958 and 1968. Politician and educationist Dayananda Sagar (1922–1982) was his uncle.

Career
Vajramuni was a college dropout and held a degree in cinematography. A product of the Kannada amateur theatre, he performed regularly in the mid-1960s for Gubbi Veeranna's theatre company among others. He impressed Puttanna Kanagal with his performance as Ravana in Kanagal Prabhakar Shastri's play Prachanda Ravana who offered Vajramuni a role in the film Saavira Mettilu. The film however got shelved, but was completed by K. S. L. Swamy and released in 2006. Kanagal eventually cast him in Mallammana Pavada (1969), which would become Vajramuni's first release. Producers insisted that Udaykumar would be a better choice to match to Shivaji Ganeshan who played the role in the Tamil version, but Puttanna insisted that it had to be Vajramuni. He went on to cast Vajramuni again in Gejje Pooje (1969). Impressed by his performances in these two films, director S. Siddalingaiah cast him in his 1971 film, Thayi Devaru.

Vajramuni acted in a number of films such as Mayura, Sampathige Saval, Daari Tappida Maga, Premada Kanike, Giri Kanye, Shankar Guru and Aakasmika with Rajkumar.

Personal life 
Vajramuni was married to Lakshmi, daughter of a family friend, on 28 May 1967. During the time, he worked as a caretaker of the family's sawmill while also performing on stage. They had three sons together.

Vajramuni's health condition worsened starting 1998 when he began suffering from kidney-related illness. Deteriorating health due multiple diseases including chronic diabetes led to his death at 5:30 a.m. (IST) on 5 January 2006, at a private hospital in Bangalore. His grandson is a child actor and has appeared in the television series, Uge Uge Maadeshwara.

Partial filmography

 Mallammana Pavaada (1969)...Suryakanth
 Gejje Pooje (1969)
 Aaliya Geliya (1970)
 Thayi Devaru (1971)...Somanna
 Sipayi Ramu (1971)...Sudhakar
 Nyayave Devaru (1971)...Vajramuni
 Sakshatkara (1971)...Naganna
 Bangaarada Manushya (1972)...Keshava
 Naagarahaavu (1972)...Laxmu
 Kulla Agent 000 (1972)
 Kranti Veera (1972)
 Bhale Huchcha (1972)...Giri
 Bidugade (1973)...Gopal
 Mooroovare Vajragalu (1973)...Duryodhana
 Bangaarada Panjara (1973)
 Bhakta Kumbara (1974)...Krishna
 Upasane (1974)...Neelakantaiah
 Sampathige Saval (1974)...Siddappa
 Sri Srinivasa Kalyana (1974)...Bhrigu
 Mayura (1975)...Vishnugopa
 Daari Tappida Maga (1975)
 Kalla Kulla (1975)
 Premada Kanike (1976)...Chandru
 Bangarada Gudi (1976)
 Bahaddur Gandu (1976)...Crown Prince
 Baduku Bangaaravayithu (1976)
 Badavara Bandhu (1976)...Gopinatha
 Aparadhi (1976)
 Babruvahana (1977)...Vrishaketu
 Srimanthana Magalu (1977)
 Sose Tanda Soubhagya (1977)...Karigowda
 Giri Kanye (1977)...Keshava
 Galate Samsara (1977)
 Shankar Guru (1978)...Premakumar
 Vasantha Lakshmi (1978)
 Sneha Sedu (1978)
 Siritanakke Savaal (1978)
 Operation Diamond Racket (1978)
 Muyyige Muyyi (1978)
 Madhura Sangama (1978)...Vasu
 Kiladi Kittu (1978)
 Kiladi Jodi (1978)
 Pakka Kalla (1979)
 Balina Guri (1979)
 Huliya Haalina Mevu (1979)...Bhima
 Nanobba Kalla (1979)...Bhaskar
 Maria My Darling (1980)
 Kaalinga (1980)
 Ravichandra (1980)
 Point Parimala (1980)
 Pattanakke Banda Pathniyaru (1980)
 Bhoomige Banda Bhagavantha (1981)...Guruji
 Jivakke Jiva (1981)
 Antha (1981)...Ajab Singh
 Bhaari Bharjari Bete (1981)
 Garuda Rekhe (1982)
 Oorige Upakari (1982)
 Karmika Kallanalla (1982)
 Jimmy Gallu (1982)
 Sahasa Simha (1982)...Shankarlal/Dheerajlal
 Nanna Devaru (1982)
 Khadeema Kallaru (1982)
 Thirugu Baana (1983)
 Onde Guri (1983)
 Chandi Chamundi (1983)
 Chakravyuha (1983)...Bhupathi
 Benkiya Bale (1983)
 Hasida Hebbuli (1983)
 Nagabekamma Nagabeku (1983)
 Muthaide Bhagya (1983)
 Taaliya Bhaagya (1984)
 Madhuve Madu Tamashe Nodu (1984)...Rahim
 Huliyada Kala (1984)
 Gandu Bherunda (1984)...Mark Abraham
 Gajendra (1984)
 Chanakya (1984)
 Apoorva Sangama (1984)...Dhanraj / Rao Bahadur Saheb
 Prema Sakshi (1984)
 Male Banthu Male (1984)
 Veeradhi Veera (1985)
 Vajra Mushti (1985)
 Thayi Mamathe (1985)
 Nanna Prathigne (1985)
 Kumkuma Thanda Saubhagya (1985)
 Maruthi Mahime (1985)
 Katha Nayaka (1986)
 Bettada Thayi (1986)
 Brahmastra (1986)
 Bete (1986)
 Satkaara (1986)
 Sathyam Shivam Sundaram (1987)
 Jayasimha (1987)
 Digvijaya (1987)
 Asha (1987)
 Thaliya Aane (1987)
 Sangliyana (1988)...Nagappa
 Vijaya Khadga (1988)
 Thaayi Karulu (1988)
 Yuga Purusha (1989)...Anthony D'Costa
 Rudra (1989)
 C.B.I. Shankar (1989)...Narayana Gowda
 Onti Salaga (1989)
 Hongkongnalli Agent Amar (1989)
 Ranabheri (1990)
 Raja Kempu Roja (1990)
 Khiladi Tata (1990)
 Police Matthu Dada (1991)...Nageshwar Rao
 Kaliyuga Bheema (1991)
 Durgashtami (1991)
 Gowri Kalyana (1991)
 Purushotthama (1992)
 Rajadhi Raja (1992)
 Mysore Jaana (1992)
 Halli Krishna Delhi Radha (1992)
 Sahasi (1992)
 Hosa Kalla Hale Kulla (1992)
 Kanasina Rani (1992)
 Aakasmika (1993)...Vyasaraya
 Sri Devi Mookambika (1993)
 Rayaru Bandaru Mavana Manege (1993)...police officer
 Mahendra Varma (1993)
 Jana Mecchida Maga (1993)
 Kollura Sri Mookambika (1993)...Mookasura
 Lockup Death (1994)...Venkataramayya
 Odahuttidavaru (1994)
 Bhairava (1994)
 Prem Path (1994)
 Musuku (1994)
 Mister Mahesh Kumar (1994)
 Karnataka Suputra(1996)
 Circle Inspector (1996)
 Swathi (1997)
 Simhada Mari (1997)...Bhupathi
 Dayadi (1998)
 Paalegara (2003)

Awards
Karnataka State Film Awards
 1982–83: Best Supporting Actor — Bettale Seve''
 2005: Lifetime Contribution to Kannada Cinema Award

References

External links
 
 

1944 births
2006 deaths
Indian male film actors
Male actors in Kannada cinema
Male actors from Bangalore
Indian male stage actors
Male actors in Kannada theatre
20th-century Indian male actors
21st-century Indian male actors